A fabula crepidata or fabula cothurnata is a Latin tragedy with Greek subjects. The genre probably originated in adaptations of Greek tragedy (hence the names, coming from crepida = sandal and cothurnus) beginning in  the early third century BC. Only nine have survived intact, all by Seneca. Of the plays written by Lucius Livius Andronicus, Gnaeus Naevius, Quintus Ennius, Marcus Pacuvius, Lucius Accius, and others, only titles, small fragments, and occasionally brief summaries are left. Ovid's Medea also did not survive.

See also
Fabula atellana
Fabula palliata
Fabula praetexta
Fabula saltata
Fabula togata
Theatre of ancient Rome

Sources
 Bernhard Zimmermann and Thomas Baier "Tragedy" in: Brill's New Pauly, Antiquity volumes edited by: Hubert Cancik and Helmuth Schneider. Consulted online on 21 July 2017

Tragedies (dramas)
Latin-language literature
Ancient Roman theatre
History of theatre
Greco-Roman relations in classical antiquity